Dominique Bourg (born 11 August 1953 in Tavaux) is a French philosopher. Since 2006, he is professor at the Faculty of Geosciences and Environment of the University of Lausanne (Switzerland).

He has two doctorates and is a specialist of the environment, global changes, and sustainable development. He published many articles and books and participated in various committees related to the environment.

Works 

Dominique Bourg co-directed La pensée écologique. Une anthologie (literally "Ecological Thinking: an Anthology") with Antoine Fragnière (2014) and the Dictionnaire de la pensée écologique ("Dictionary of Ecological Thinking") with Alain Papaux (2015). He analyses that, "Ecological thinking is characterised by a critique of modernity, a scepticism about the possibility of solving environmental problems through technology and a questioning of the separation between humans and nature".

According to Bourg, the root of the global problem (the deterioration of the environment) is the flow of materials and energy (linked with consumerism). He also thinks that over the last decades, economic growth increased wealth concentration and economic inequality while accelerating the destruction of natural resources and ecosystems, but without fulfilling its promise to provide more jobs or make people happier.

Honours 

 Prix du « Promeneur solitaire » in 2003.
 Officer of the National Order of Merit since 2004.
 Officer of the Legion of Honour since 2013 (Knight since 2001).
 « Prix du livre environnement » of the Veolia Foundation in 2015, for the Dictionnaire de la pensée écologique ("Dictionary of Ecological Thinking").

Other 

Dominique Bourg was part of the "Coppens commission" who prepared the French Charter for the Environment of 2004.

Notes and references

See also 
 List of French philosophers

External links 

 Page on the website of the University of Lausanne

20th-century French philosophers
Anti-consumerists
Degrowth advocates
University of Strasbourg alumni
Academic staff of the University of Lausanne
1953 births
Officiers of the Légion d'honneur
Officers of the Ordre national du Mérite
Living people
French male non-fiction writers
French expatriates in Switzerland